The Ethiopian eunuch is a figure in the New Testament of the Bible; the story of his conversion to Christianity is recounted in Acts 8.

Biblical narrative
Philip the Evangelist was told by an angel to go to the road from Jerusalem to Gaza, and there he encountered the Ethiopian eunuch, the treasurer of the Candace, Queen of the Ethiopians (Ancient Greek: Κανδάκη, the "Candace" was the Meroitic language term for "queen" or possibly "royal woman"). The eunuch had been to Jerusalem to worship and was returning home. Sitting in his chariot, he was reading the Book of Isaiah, specifically . Philip asked the Ethiopian, "Do you understand what you are reading?" He said he did not ("How can I understand unless I have a teacher to teach me?"), and asked Philip to explain the text to him. Philip told him the Gospel of Jesus, and the Ethiopian asked to be baptized. They went down into a water source, traditionally thought to be the Dhirweh fountain near Halhul, and Philip baptized him.

In the King James Version and the Catholic Douay-Rheims Version, the Ethiopian says, "I believe that Jesus Christ is the Son of God" (verse 37), but this is omitted in most modern versions. D.A. Hubbard suggests that confession is "not supported in the better manuscripts [i.e. the Alexandrian text-type])", although the Ethiopian is still "one of the outstanding converts in Acts."

After this, Philip was suddenly taken away by the Spirit of the Lord, and the eunuch "went on his way rejoicing" (verse 39).

Christian traditions
Church Father St. Irenaeus of Lyons in his book Adversus haereses (Against the Heresies, an early anti-Gnostic theological work) 3:12:8 (180 AD), wrote regarding the Ethiopian eunuch, "This man (Simeon Bachos the Eunuch) was also sent into the regions of Ethiopia, to preach what he had himself believed, that there was one God preached by the prophets, but that the Son of this (God) had already made (His) appearance in human flesh, and had been led as a sheep to the slaughter; and all the other statements which the prophets made regarding Him."

One of the traditional sites of the baptism is the Ein Hanya Spring. Others place the traditional site of baptism at the Dhirweh fountain, near Halhul.

Assessment and interpretation

Religion 
The Ethiopian eunuch's religion of origin is significant because of the subsequent implications of his conversion to Christianity. There are many competing theories for the eunuch's pre-conversion religious status in relation to Judaism and Christianity. 

Modern scholarship tends to place the Ethiopian eunuch in the "intermediate position between Jew and Gentile." Scott Shauf suggests that the "primary point of the story is about carrying the gospel to the end of the earth, not about establishing a mission to Gentiles," and thus Luke "does not bring the Gentile status of the Ethiopian into the foreground." However, "the suggestion that the eunuch is or at least might be a Gentile in the story, by both his ethnic and possibly physical description" may leave more formative possibility than if he had been explicitly categorized. Ernst Haenchen builds on Ferdinand Christian Baur's work (1792–1860) in concluding that "the author of Acts made the eunuch's religious identity ambiguous intentionally" so as to preserve the tradition that claimed Cornelius as the first Gentile convert as well as the tradition that claimed the Ethiopian Eunuch as the first Gentile convert.

Sexuality 
Commentators generally suggest that the combination of "eunuch" together with the title "court official" indicates a literal eunuch, who would have been excluded from the Temple by the restriction in Deuteronomy 23:1.

Race and origins 

"Candace" was the name given in Greco-Roman historiography to all the female rulers or consorts of the Kingdom of Kush (now part of Sudan). The capital city was Meroë, and the title of "Candace" derives from a Meroitic word, kdke, that referred to any royal woman. "Ethiopian" was a Greek term for black-skinned peoples generally, often applied to Kush (which was well known to the Hebrews and often mentioned in the Hebrew Bible). The eunuch was not from the land today known as Ethiopia, which corresponds to the ancient Kingdom of Aksum, which conquered Kush in the fourth century. The first writer to call it Ethiopia was Philostorgius around 440.

Some scholars, such as Frank M. Snowden, Jr., interpret the story as emphasizing that early Christian communities accepted members regardless of race: "Ethiopians were the yardstick by which antiquity measured colored peoples." Others, such as Clarice Martin, write that it is a commentary on the religion rather than on its adherents, showing Christianity's geographical extent; Gay L. Byron goes further, saying, "The Ethiopian eunuch was used by Luke to indicate that salvation could extend even to Ethiopians and Blacks." David Tuesday Adamo suggests that the word used here (Αίθίοψ, aithiops) is best translated simply as "African."

Related figures 
C. K. Barrett contrasts the Ethiopian eunuch's story with that of Cornelius the Centurion, another convert. He notes that while the Ethiopian continues on his journey home and passes out of the narrative, Cornelius and his followers form another church in Judea, and speculates that this reflects a desire to focus on Peter rather than Philip.  Robert O'Toole argues that the way Philip is taken away parallels the way Jesus disappears after he has been talking to the disciples on the road to Emmaus in Luke 24.

There are literary parallels between the story of the Ethiopian eunuch in Acts and that of Ebed-Melech, an Ethiopian eunuch in the Book of Jeremiah.

Further reading

References

External links

African Christians
Converts to Christianity
Ethiopian saints
Eunuchs
LGBT and Christianity
People in Acts of the Apostles
Unnamed people of the Bible